Karl Menning (11 May 1874 in Tartu – 5 March 1941 in Tartu) was an Estonian theatre director, critic and diplomat.

In 1902 he graduated from University of Tartu's department of religion. 1906-1914 he was the first theatre director of Vanemuine theatre.

From 1921 until 1933 he was the Estonia ambssador to Germany. In 1925 he was appointed the Estonian ambassador to Austria and in 1931 to Hungary. From 1934 until 1937, he was the Estonian ambassador to Latvia.

In Tartu, there is the monument to Menning. The monument was created by Mare Mikhof, and was erected in 2006.

References

1874 births
1941 deaths
Estonian theatre directors
Estonian critics
Ambassadors of Estonia to Germany
Ambassadors of Estonia to Latvia
Estonian diplomats
University of Tartu alumni
People from Tartu